Disa zombica is a species of orchid (family Orchidaceae), native to eastern and southern Tropical Africa. Its roots are edible and are made into a delicacy called chinaka in Malawi.

References

External links

 
 

zombica
Flora of the Democratic Republic of the Congo
Flora of East Tropical Africa
Flora of South Tropical Africa
Plants described in 1898